Regimental Square is a war memorial in the Wynyard area in the city centre of Sydney, Australia. An upgrade of the area was expected to be completed by mid-2016.

Description

The memorial is in the form of a small, pedestrianised square, occupying the whole width of a section of Wynyard Street that adjoins George Street, a major thoroughfare. The memorial was erected to commemorate the campaigns of the Royal Australian Regiment in Korea, Malaya and Vietnam. A series of bronze sculptures of soldiers in action, are attached to a wall of Sydney sandstone, 8 metres long x 1.5 metres high. Dennis Adams OAM was commissioned, to create the memorial, by the Royal Australian Regiment Association, the funds acquired through subscriptions from members and friends, supplemented by a gift of $3,000 from the Government of South Korea. On 8 December 1976 the memorial was unveiled by the then Governor of New South Wales, Sir Roden Cutler.

Gallery

See also
 Royal Australian Regiment

References

External links 

 Royal Australian Regiment Association NSW

Australian military memorials
Buildings and structures in Sydney
Sydney central business district